Sunshine Kaidi New Energy Group Co. Ltd. (Sunshine Kaidi, former name: Wuhan Kaidi Holding Investment Co., Ltd.) is a Chinese holding company. It is one of the largest bioenergy  companies in China. The company is privately owned with the controlling stake belonging to Chen Yilong. Its subsidiary Kaidi Ecological and Environmental Technology Co. Ltd. in which Sunshine Kaidi owns a 29.08% stake, is listed in the Shenzhen stock market, but the trading is suspended.

History
The company was formed in 1992.

In 2014, Kaidi acquired biofuel technology and equipment from American company Rentech. In 2015, it acquired Calgary-based plasma gasification company Alter NRG.

Since 2018, the company has become visibly strained by its debt load with its subsidiary Kaidi Ecological and Environmental Technology Co. Ltd. defaulting on a bond.

Markets
The company is active in 24 Chinese provinces and Vietnam.

The company has had plans to expand to European markets with its main investment being a refinery in Kemi, Finland under its Finnish subsidiary.

References

Energy companies established in 1992
Companies based in Wuhan
Biodiesel producers
Renewable energy technology companies
Technology companies of China
Renewable energy companies of China
Holding companies of China
Renewable resource companies established in 1992